Allandale is a locality in Cessnock and Maitland in the Hunter Region of New South Wales, Australia. The traditional owners and custodians of the Maitland area are the Wonnarua people.

History

References 

Suburbs of City of Cessnock
Suburbs of Maitland, New South Wales
Towns in the Hunter Region